Patricia Hanebeck is a German footballer currently playing for FF USV Jena in Germany's Frauen Bundesliga.

As an Under-19 international she won the 2004 U-19 World Championship.

References

External links
 

1986 births
Living people
FCR 2001 Duisburg players
German women's footballers
Hamburger SV (women) players
SC 07 Bad Neuenahr players
1. FFC Turbine Potsdam players
SC Sand players
FF USV Jena players
Women's association football midfielders
People from Siegburg
Sportspeople from Cologne (region)
Footballers from North Rhine-Westphalia